The women's 400 metres hurdles at the 2007 World Championships in Athletics was held at the Nagai Stadium on 27, 28 and 30 August.

Medalists

Schedule

Results

Heats
Qualification: First 4 in each heat (Q) and the next 4 fastest (q) advance to the semifinals.

Semifinals
Qualification: First 2 in each semifinal (Q) and the next 2 fastest (q) advance to the final.

Final

References
Results

Hurdles 400 metres
400 metres hurdles at the World Athletics Championships
2007 in women's athletics